William Casper Fischer (born March 5, 1929) is an American politician in the state of Minnesota. He served in the Minnesota House of Representatives from 1963–1966 and 1967–1972.

References

1929 births
Living people
Members of the Minnesota House of Representatives